General elections were held in Barbados on 22 January 1991 to elect all 28 members (MPs) of the House of Assembly of Barbados. The result was a victory for the ruling Democratic Labour Party (DLP), which won 18 of the 28 seats. The opposition Barbados Labour Party led by Henry Forde won ten seats, an increase of seven compared to the 1986 elections. Voter turnout was 63.7%. DLP leader Lloyd Erskine Sandiford remained Prime Minister.

This was the first general election contested by the National Democratic Party (NDP), which had been founded in 1989 by four defecting DLP MPs, led by the former finance minister Richard Haynes. Despite polling nearly 7% of the national vote, all four lost their seats and no new NDP members were elected under Barbados' first-past-the-post electoral system.

Results

References

Barbados
1991 in Barbados
Elections in Barbados
January 1991 events in North America